Istamo is a Syrian village in the Qardaha District in Latakia Governorate. According to the Syria Central Bureau of Statistics (CBS), Istamo had a population of 2,288 in the 2004 census.

References

Alawite communities in Syria
Populated places in Qardaha District